Alejandro Zamudio Galindo (born 25 February 1998) is a Mexican professional footballer who plays as a midfielder for Pumas Tabasco on loan from UNAM.

Career
Zamudio was loaned out to Club Puebla for the 2019 season.

Career statistics

Club

Honours
Mexico U17
CONCACAF U-17 Championship: 2015

References

External links
 
 

Living people
1998 births
Mexican footballers
Association football midfielders
Club Universidad Nacional footballers
Club Puebla players
Liga MX players
Liga Premier de México players
Tercera División de México players
Footballers from Mexico City